Archibald Crabbe (7 March 1903 – 12 July 1981) was a British bobsledder. He competed in the four-man event at the 1924 Winter Olympics. Crabbe was awarded with the OBE in 1945.

References

External links
 

1903 births
1981 deaths
British male bobsledders
Olympic bobsledders of Great Britain
Bobsledders at the 1924 Winter Olympics
Sportspeople from Edinburgh